The Calgary Fire of 1886, also known as the Great Calgary Fire of 1886, was a conflagration that burned in the Canadian city of Calgary on Sunday November 7, 1886. The fire began at the rear wall of the local flour and feed store, and spread through the community's wooden structures leading to the destruction of 18 buildings. 

The fire resulted in changes in local construction practices to stop the likelihood and rapid spread of future fires including an increased reliance on sandstone for new structures, which resulted in the town's early nickname "Sandstone City".

Background
The Town of Calgary was officially incorporated exactly two years earlier on November 7, 1884 under Northwest Territories Ordinance. The municipal government was in disorder following the events of the January 1886 Calgary municipal election which saw incumbent Mayor George Murdoch decisively win the election which was overturned by Stipendiary Magistrate Jeremiah Travis for elector list fraud and appointed James Reilly as mayor and replaced two other members of council. Neither faction was capable of governing the town, which led to the newly ordered chemical engine for the recently organized Calgary Fire Department (Calgary Hook, Ladder and Bucket Corps) to be held in the Canadian Pacific Railway's storage yard due to lack of payment.

Local government would be restored a few days before the fire in the November 3, 1886 municipal election which saw George Clift King elected mayor.

Fire and aftermath
In the early morning of November 7, 1886, flames were reported at the rear wall of the Parish and Son flour and feed store. The Calgary Hook, Ladder and Bucket Corps was sent to battle the fire, and broke into the Canadian Pacific Railway's freight shed to retrieve the impounded chemical engine.

The Corps determined it was necessary to form a firebreak to prevent further damage, and former mayor George Murdoch agreed and participated in the demolition of his harness shop. An attempt was made to use gunpowder to blow up Murdoch's store, however the Calgary Weekly Herald noted that this "failed owing to the force of the charge not being sufficiently concentrated". The fire was stopped then extinguished after the break was created. This would be the second time George Murdoch would lose a business to fire, the first occurring in 1871 during Great Chicago Fire.

Ultimately, fourteen buildings were destroyed or razed in attempts to control the blaze, including four stores, three warehouses, three hotels, a tinsmith shop and a saloon. Losses were estimated at $103,200; however no one was killed or injured.  Authorities suggested arson may have been involved, but no arrests were made.

To reduce the potential for future fires, city officials drafted a bylaw requiring all large downtown buildings were to be built with sandstone, which was readily available nearby in the form of Paskapoo sandstone. Following the fire several quarries were opened around the city by prominent local businessmen including Thomas Edworthy, Wesley Fletcher Orr, J. G. McCallum, and William Oliver. Buildings built with sandstone following the fire included the Knox Presbyterian Church (1887), Imperial Bank Building (1887), Calgary City Hall (1911), and Calgary Courthouse No. 2 (1914).

List of buildings destroyed
Athletic Hotel
Mountain View Hotel
Mortinier's Bake Shop
Sherman House
Misenv Manufacturing Co.
Dunn & Linestone Warehouse
I. G. Baker & Co.
Union Hotel
Hunter Store and Dwelling
Ellis Store and Building
S. Parish & Co.
J. Hodway Building
George Murdoch's harness shop - Not consumed by fire.

See also
History of firefighting
 List of fires in Canada
 List of disasters in Canada

References

History of Calgary
1886 fires in North America
1886 in Alberta 
1886 disasters in Canada 
1886 in the Northwest Territories
Urban fires in Canada
Disasters in Alberta
Disasters in the Northwest Territories
1880s in Calgary
November 1886 events